The 1958–59 California Golden Bears men's basketball team represented the University of California, Berkeley in NCAA University Division basketball competition. Led by fifth-year head coach Pete Newell, the Golden Bears won their only national championship.

Season Summary
Cal wasn’t a team that thrilled many people beyond its own fans. One writer described the Bears as "just a bunch of guys named Joe." But Cal was coached by one of the greats, Pete Newell, and his team-oriented, defensive style won the national championship as the Bears beat two teams in the Final Four that featured two of the best guards in history, Cincinnati (Oscar Robertson) and West Virginia (Jerry West).

Roster

Schedule and results

|-
!colspan=9 style=| Regular Season

|-
!colspan=9 style=| NCAA Tournament

Rankings

Awards and honors

NBA draft
Two Golden Bears were selected in the next two NBA drafts

References

California Golden Bears
California Golden Bears men's basketball seasons
NCAA Division I men's basketball tournament championship seasons
NCAA Division I men's basketball tournament Final Four seasons
California
California Golden Bears Basketball
California Golden Bears Basketball